Ostrava Basin is a lowland region, located in eastern Czech Republic and southern Poland. Its name comes from the city of Ostrava. Coal deposits were discovered in the late 18th century, as a result, the area was heavily industrialized in the 19th century, and henceforth urbanized.

References 

Landforms of the Czech Republic
Plains of Poland